Homonuclear molecules, or homonuclear species, are molecules composed of only one element. Homonuclear molecules may consist of various numbers of atoms. The size of the molecule an element can form depends on the element's properties, and some elements form molecules of more than one size. The most familiar homonuclear molecules are diatomic molecule, which consist of two atoms, although not all diatomic molecules are homonuclear. Homonuclear diatomic molecules include hydrogen (H2), oxygen (O2), nitrogen (N2) and all of the halogens. Ozone (O3) is a common triatomic homonuclear molecule. Homonuclear tetratomic molecules include arsenic (As4) and phosphorus (P4).

Allotropes are different chemical forms of the same element (not containing any other element).  In that sense, allotropes are all homonuclear. Many elements have multiple allotropic forms. In addition to the most common form of gaseous oxygen, O2, and ozone, there are other allotropes of oxygen. Sulfur forms several allotropes containing different numbers of sulfur atoms, including diatomic, triatomic, hexatomic and octatomic (S2, S3, S6, S8) forms, though the first three are rare. The element carbon is known to have a number of homonuclear molecules, including diamond and graphite.

Sometimes a cluster of atoms of a single kind of metallic element is considered a single molecule.

See also
 Heteronuclear molecule
 :Category:Homonuclear diatomic molecules
 :Category:Homonuclear triatomic molecules

References

External links

 
Sets of chemical elements